Ammonia is a genus of marine foraminifers. It is one of the most abundant foraminifer genera worldwide and occurs in sheltered and shallow marine intertidal environments, sometimes in brackish waters.

Species 
The classification of the genus Ammonia in species is controversial. While several different forms exist, many authors consider the genus to consist of a single species, Ammonia beccarii, with many ecophenotypes. However, recent molecular studies revealed that the genus consists of many species, although they may be difficult to discriminate based on morphology.

Based on a comparison between molecular results and morphology, the following species appear to be valid:
Ammonia aberdoveyensis Haynes, 1973
Ammonia aomoriensis (Asano, 1951)
Ammonia aoteana (Finlay, 1940)
Ammonia batava (Hofker, 1951)
Ammonia beccarii (Linnaeus, 1758)
Ammonia convexa (Collins, 1958)
Ammonia irridescens (Arnal, 1958) (maybe a synonym of A. tepida)
Ammonia limnetes (Todd & Bronnimann, 1957)
Ammonia sobrina (Shupack, 1934)
Ammonia tepida (Cushman, 1926)

Additionally, several other molecular types have been discovered that do not match any of the described species and thus possibly represent new taxa.

References 

Rotaliida genera